McEwen-Samuels-Marr House is a historic home located at Columbus, Indiana.  The rear section was built in 1864, and the front section in 1875.  It is a two-story, Italianate style brick dwelling.  It has a stone foundation, four brick chimneys, and a hipped roof.  The building has housed the Bartholomew County Historical Museum since the 1970s.

It was added to the National Register of Historic Places in 1977.

References

External links
Bartholomew County Historical Museum

Columbus, Indiana
History museums in Indiana
Houses on the National Register of Historic Places in Indiana
Italianate architecture in Indiana
Houses completed in 1864
Museums in Bartholomew County, Indiana
National Register of Historic Places in Bartholomew County, Indiana
Houses in Bartholomew County, Indiana